Alkanna tinctoria, the dyer's alkanet or simply alkanet, is a herbaceous flowering plant in the borage family Boraginaceae. Its roots are used to produce a red dye. The plant is also known as dyers' bugloss, orchanet, Spanish bugloss, or Languedoc bugloss. It is native to the Mediterranean region. A. tinctoria has 30 chromosomes and is regarded as a dysploid at the tetraploid level (4x + 2).

A. tinctoria has a bright blue flower. The plant has a root of blackish appearance externally, but blue-red inside, with a whitish core. The root produces a fine red colouring material, which has been used as a dye in the Mediterranean region since antiquity. The dyestuff in its roots is soluble in alcohol, ether, and the oils, but is insoluble in water. It is used to give colour to wines and alcoholic tinctures, to vegetable oils, and to varnishes.

Powdered and mixed with oil, the alkanet root is used as a wood stain. When mixed into an oily environment, it imparts a crimson color to the oil, which when applied to a wood, moves the wood color towards dark-red-brown rosewood, and accentuates the grain of the wood.

Alkanet is traditionally used in Indian food under the name ratan jot, and lends its red colour to some versions of the curry dish rogan josh. In Australia, alkanet is approved for use as a food colouring, but in the European Union, it is not.

It has been used as colorant for lipstick and rouge.

In alkaline environments, alkanet dye has a blue color, with the color changing to crimson on addition of an acid.  The colour is red at pH 6.1, purple at 8.8 and blue at pH 10. 

The colouring agent in A. tinctoria root has been chemically isolated and named alkannin.

In folk medicine, it is also used to treat abscesses and inflammations.

In English in the late medieval era, the name alkanet meant A. tinctoria. In the centuries since then, the name has come to be used informally for some botanically related other plants; see Alkanet.

References

Attribution

Boraginoideae
Plant dyes
Food colorings
Herbs